Wretham and Hockham railway station was a station in Norfolk serving the villages of Wretham and Hockham. It was on the Great Eastern Railway branch line between Swaffham and Thetford.
The station was opened for goods traffic on 28 January 1869 and for passengers on 18 October 1869. It closed in 1964.

References

Disused railway stations in Norfolk
Former Great Eastern Railway stations
Beeching closures in England
Railway stations in Great Britain opened in 1869
Railway stations in Great Britain closed in 1964